Styloctenium (known as stripe-faced fruit bat or stripe-faced flying fox) is a genus of stripe-faced fruit bat in the Pteropodidae (megabat) family. It comprises the following species:
Mindoro stripe-faced fruit bat, Styloctenium mindorensis
Sulawesi stripe-faced fruit bat, Styloctenium wallacei

References

Bibliography

Esselstyn, J. A. 2007. "A new species of stripe-faced fruit bat (Chiroptera: Pteropodidae: Styloctenium) from the Philippines." Journal of Mammalogy, 88:951-958

 
Bat genera
Taxa named by Paul Matschie
Taxonomy articles created by Polbot